The 2006 World Karate Championships are the 18th edition of the World Karate Championships, and were held in Tampere, Finland from October 12 to October 15, 2006.

Medalists

Men

Women

Medal table

Participating nations 
766 athletes from 81 nations competed.

 (2)
 (11)
 (11)
 (9)
 (4)
 (13)
 (5)
 (16)
 (9)
 (24)
 (7)
 (13)
 (1)
 (6)
 (4)
 (7)
 (24)
 (3)
 (14)
 (5)
 (16)
 (12)
 (11)
 (11)
 (24)
 (19)
 (12)
 (7)
 (13)
 (3)
 (2)
 (3)
 (19)
 (16)
 (3)
 (2)
 (16)
 (8)
 (19)
 (10)
 (12)
 (9)
 (2)
 (1)
 (11)
 (8)
 (14)
 (8)
 (15)
 (1)
 (11)
 (1)
 (4)
 (1)
 (6)
 (4)
 (7)
 (6)
 (9)
 (2)
 (7)
 (3)
 (22)
 (10)
 (13)
 (19)
 (1)
 (10)
 (5)
 (16)
 (6)
 (21)
 (16)
 (13)
 (8)
 (17)
 (3)
 (16)
 (11)
 (1)
 (2)

References

External links
 World Karate Federation
 Karate Records – World Championship 2006
 Men's resultsWomen's resultsTeam results

World Championships
World Karate Championships
World Karate Championships
Karate Championships
Karate competitions in Finland
Sports competitions in Tampere
October 2006 sports events in Europe